Codakia distinguenda, the elegant lucine, is a species of marine bivalve mollusc.  It was first described to science in 1872 by George Washington Tryon Jr.

Description 
The elegant lucine has large, flattened, saucer-like valves.  They are the largest member of their family along the west coast of the Americas.  The valves are between 50mm and 140mm (2 to 5.5 inches) in width.  The exterior of the shell is white with a vivid reticulation, or net-like sculpture of rays and arcs.  The interior of the shell shows rose-red margins with a creamy yellow center.

Distribution 
The elegant lucine is found in the east Pacific Ocean from Baja California to Peru, including the Gulf of California.  It is found in the Galapagos Islands.  It is a shallow water species that lives from the intertidal zone to 50 meters (165 feet) deep.  Elegant lucines are infaunal, that is they live buried in sand or mud on the seabed.

Life history 
The elegant lucine is a filter feeder, straining plankton and other nutrients from sea water that it pumps through its body.  These animals also obtain energy through chemosymbiosis.  They acquire their symbiotic bacteria from sea water.  The bacteria are bathed in the sea water pumping through the gills of the animal from which they obtain sulfides and oxygen.  The bacteria use these inputs to synthesize nutritious carbon compounds that are transferred to the lucine.  In times of starvation, the lucine will consume the bacteria.

References 

Lucinidae
Bivalves of North America
Molluscs of the Pacific Ocean
Molluscs described in 1872
Taxa named by George Washington Tryon